Minerul Stadium is a multi-use stadium in Lupeni, Romania. It is currently used mostly for football matches and is the home ground of Hercules Lupeni. The stadium holds 3,000 people.

Football venues in Romania